The New Hampshire Democratic Party (NHDP) is the affiliate of the Democratic Party in the U.S. state of New Hampshire. Its chair is Raymond Buckley, and its vice chairs are Martha Fuller Clark and Bette Lasky. The most recent Democratic governor was Maggie Hassan, who served from 2013 to 2017.

The only U.S. president from New Hampshire was a Democrat, Franklin Pierce, who served from 1853 to 1857.

The party has played a pivotal role in the election process for the president of the United States, with New Hampshire holding the first primary in the nation. Local Democrats in New Hampshire have historically had outsized influence in determining their national presidential nominee.

Current elected officials

The New Hampshire Democratic Party holds both of the state's U.S. Senate seats, and both of the state's seats in the U.S. House of Representatives. Democrats hold a minority in the New Hampshire House of Representatives and New Hampshire Senate.

Members of Congress

U.S. Senate
Class II: Jeanne Shaheen
Class III: Maggie Hassan

Jeanne Shaheen is the first woman in United States history to be elected to both a governorship and a U.S. senator. She served for three terms as New Hampshire's governor between 1997 and 2003. In 2008 she became the first woman elected to the U,S. Senate from New Hampshire. Senator Shaheen is on the Committee of Appropriations, where she sits as ranking member of the Subcommittee on Commerce, Justice, Science, and Related Agencies. Senator Shaheen is also a member of the Armed Services Committee, Committee on Foreign Relations, Committee on Small Business and Entrepreneurship, Select Committee on Ethics, and Commission on Security and Cooperation in Europe.

Maggie Hassan was the second woman in United States history to be elected to both a governorship and a U.S. senator. Senator Hassan served for two terms from 2013 to 2017 as New Hampshire's 81st governor. Senator Hassan won her election to the U.S. Senate in 2016, beating out incumbent Senator Kelly Ayotte by a mere 1,017 votes. Senator Hassan sits on the Senate Committee on Finance, Committee on Health, Education, Labor, and Pensions, Committee on Homeland Security and Governmental Affairs, and the Joint Economic Committee. Prior to being governor, Senator Hassan was a state senator from District 23 from 2004 to 2010, in which she served as Majority Leader from 2005 to 2010.

U.S. House of Representatives
 Chris Pappas; 1st district
 Ann McLane Kuster; 2nd district

Chris Pappas was elected to his first term as a member of Congress in 2018, where he serves on the House Committee on Transportation and Infrastructure as well as the Committee on Veterans' Affairs. Congressman Pappas is the first member of the LGBTQ community to be elected to federal office from the state of New Hampshire. Prior to serving in Congress, Chris Pappas was a member of the New Hampshire Executive Council, representing District 4 from 2013 to 2019.

Ann McLane Kuster was elected to a historic fourth term in 2018.

Executive Council 

 District 2 – Cinde Warmington – 2021–present

Legislative
 Senate Leader: Donna Soucy
 House Leader: Matthew Wilhelm

Party platform
According to the 2020 New Hampshire Democratic Party Platform:

New Hampshire presidential primary
New Hampshire holds the first primary in the nation to kick off an election cycle every four years. This is a part of the long process in choosing nominations for both the Democratic and Republican parties. New Hampshire plays a key role in choosing nominees due to the massive amounts of media attention it gets. Being first involves having a huge impact on the process as a whole by setting the bar for latter states.

New Hampshire has been a bellwether for politicians seeking election. A weak showing in New Hampshire has caused office seekers to drop out of the race early. In 1952 and in 1968 Harry Truman and Lyndon Johnson both drop their reelection campaigns after poor showings in the New Hampshire primary.

New Hampshire started holding a primary in 1916 and has held the First in the Nation primary since 1920. At first voters could only vote on delegates to send the party national conventions. It was Richard F. Upton, speaker of the New Hampshire House of Representatives, who amended the law to allow for direct vote of presidential candidates. In 1952 New Hampshire voters started voting for the candidates.

This new law inspired the voters of New Hampshire to write in Dwight D. Eisenhower's name as a candidate for the 1952 Republican New Hampshire primary ballot. Eisenhower was able to beat Republican Party leader Robert A. Taft without Eisenhower even going to the state. He would go on to win the nomination and become President.

Presidential primary winners

 2020: Bernie Sanders
 2016: Bernie Sanders
 2012: Barack Obama
 2008: Hillary Clinton
 2004: John Kerry
 2000: Al Gore
 1996: Bill Clinton
 1992: Paul Tsongas
 1988: Michael Dukakis
 1984: Gary Hart
 1980: Jimmy Carter
 1976: Jimmy Carter
 1972: Edmund Muskie
 1968: Lyndon B. Johnson
 1964: Lyndon B. Johnson
 1960: John F. Kennedy
 1956: Estes Kefauver
 1952: Estes Kefauver

Past elected officials

Governor
In chronological order:
 Benjamin Pierce (served 1829–1830)
 Matthew Harvey (1830–1831)
 Joseph M. Harper (1831)
 Samuel Dinsmoor (1831–1834)
 William Badger (1834–1836)
 Isaac Hill (1836–1839)
 John Page (1839–1842)
 Henry Hubbard (1842–1844)
 John Hardy Steele (1844–1846)
 Jared W. Williams (1847–1849)
 Samuel Dinsmoor, Jr. (1849–1852)
 Noah Martin (1852–1854)
 Nathaniel B. Baker (1854–1855)
 James A. Weston (1871–1872; 1874–1875)
 Samuel D. Felker (1913–1915)
 Fred H. Brown (1923–1925)
 John W. King (1963–1969)
 Hugh Gallen (1979–1982)
 Jeanne Shaheen (1997–2003)
 John Lynch (2005–2013)
 Maggie Hassan (2013–2017)

U.S. Senate

In chronological order:

 Levi Woodbury (served 1825–1831; 1841–1845) Democrat-Republican prior to 1828

 Isaac Hill (served 1831–1836)
 Henry Hubbard (served 1835–1841)
  John Page (1836–1837)
 Franklin Pierce (1837–1842)
 Leonard Wilcox (1841–1843)
 Charles G. Atherton (1843–1849; 1853)
 Benning W. Jenness (1845–1846)
 Jared W. Williams (1853–1854)
 Henry F. Hollis (1913–1919)
 Fred H. Brown (1933–1939)
 Thomas J. McIntyre (1962–1979)
 John A. Durkin (1975–1980)

U.S. House

In chronological order:

 Franklin Pierce (served 1833–1837)
 Samuel Cushman (1837–1839)
 James Farrington (1837–1839)
 Joseph Weeks (1837–1839)
 Jared W. Williams (1837–1841)
 Charles G. Atherton (1837–1843)
 Ira Allen Eastman (1839–1843)
 Tristram Shaw (1839–1843)
 Edmund Burke (1839–1845)
 John Randall Reding (1841–1845)
 John P. Hale (1843–1845)
 Moses Norris, Jr. (1843–1847)
 Mace Moulton (1845–1847)
 James Hutchins Johnson (1845–1849)
 Charles H. Peaslee (1847–1853)
 Harry Hibbard (1849–1855)
 George W. Morrison (1850–1851; 1853–1855)
 George W. Kittredge (1853–1855)
 Daniel Marcy (1863–1865)
 Ellery Albee Hibbard (1871–1873)
 Samuel Newell Bell (1871–1873; 1875–1877)
 Hosea Washington Parker (1871–1875)
 Frank Jones (1875–1879)
 Luther F. McKinney (1887–1889; 1891–1893)
 Warren F. Daniell (1891–1893)
 Eugene Elliott Reed (1913–1915)
 Raymond Bartlett Stevens (1913–1915)
 William Nathaniel Rogers (1923–1925; 1932–1937)
 Alphonse Roy (1938–1939)
 Joseph Oliva Huot (1965–1967)
 Norman D'Amours (1975–1985)
 Richard Swett (1991–1995)
 Paul Hodes (2007–2011)
 Carol Shea-Porter (2007–2011; 2013–2015; 2017–2019)

See also
 New Hampshire primary
 Governor of New Hampshire
 New Hampshire State House
 New Hampshire Senate
 New Hampshire House of Representatives

References

External links
 New Hampshire Democratic Party

 
Democratic Party
Democratic Party (United States) by state